Elections for Ipswich Borough Council were held on 4 May 2006. One third of the council was up for election and the council stayed under no overall control with the Conservative-Liberal Democrat coalition continuing. 

After the election, the composition of the council was:
Conservative 19
Labour 18
Liberal Democrat 9
Independent 2

Election results

Ward results

Alexandra

Bixley

Bridge

Castle Hill

Gainsborough

Gipping

Holywells

Priory Heath

Rushmere

Sprites

St John's

St Margaret's

Stoke Park

Westgate

Whitehouse

Whitton

References
2006 Ipswich election result

2006 English local elections
2006
2000s in Suffolk